"Summer of Love" is the debut single of UK garage singer Lonyo. It was released on 26 June 2000 and features MC Onyx Stone. The song samples the 1978 song "Cruel Desilusion" by Oscar D'León's group, La Critica. The single became a hit, reaching number eight in the United Kingdom, number 31 in the Netherlands and number 46 in Italy. In the United States, it peaked at number 39 on the Billboard Dance Club Songs chart in October 2000.

Track listings

UK CD1
 "Summer of Love" (radio edit)
 "Summer of Love" (The No Bluffing Mix featuring MC Onyx Stone)
 "Summer of Love" (Ci DIY dub)

UK CD2
 "Summer of Love" (original extended)
 "Summer of Love" (Robbie Rivera Boombastic vocal)
 "Summer of Love" (Dreemhouse)

UK cassette single
 "Summer of Love" (radio edit)
 "Summer of Love" (The No Bluffing Mix featuring MC Onyx Stone)

European CD single
 "Summer of Love" (radio edit)
 "Summer of Love" (Robbie Rivera Bombastic vocal)

Charts

References

2000 songs
2000 debut singles
Epic Records singles
UK garage songs